An ammattikorkeakoulu (yrkeshögskola in Swedish, polytechnic or university of applied sciences in English), abbreviated AMK, is a Finnish institution of higher education.

The term literally means "school of higher vocational education". Although the term is often translated into English as "polytechnic", the Finnish Ministry of Education and Culture and the Rectors' Conference of Finnish Universities of Applied Sciences use the term "university of applied sciences".

Unlike universities, AMKs focus on R&D by applying previous knowledge, rather than producing new research.  They have a statutory objective in regional development. As there is mandatory five-month practical training for all students, AMKs are a platform for dispersing applied knowledge throughout higher education. AMKs provide professionals for locally important purposes and are often governed by the municipality, though they receive most of the funding from the state. No tuition fees are asked from the students from EU/EEA. Students from other countries are obliged to pay.

History
Before the AMK reform in 1993, the schools were usually called opisto and were considered vocational institutes, and were not considered universities. Their role was to give training for roles that need both practical skills and management work, such as a foreman in construction. In engineering, the degree was referred to as opistoinsinööri or teknikko. In construction, there was rakennusinsinööri, rakennusarkkitehti and rakennusmestari.

Until recently, AMKs were granting only tertiary degrees (3–4 years) that are specialized to particular vocations (e.g. insinööri, translated into English as Bachelor of Engineering); they are different from, but in their level comparable to, academic bachelor's degrees which are awarded by universities. In 2005, "higher AMK" degrees (which are translated into English as master's degrees) have been introduced for holders of an AMK degree or a similar degree, like a bachelor's degree from a university, to continue studies while also working. AMK's do not grant the higher degrees of licentiate and Ph.D. granted by universities, and a holder of an AMK higher degree might need specific studies bridging the gap between the two orientations (academic and vocational) in order to be eligible for doctoral studies in universities. This is, however, not always the case.

Finnish higher education has a dual model, where universities (yliopisto) focus on scientific or artistic master's and higher degrees, and AMKs on vocationally oriented education on bachelor and master levels. The phrase "equal but different" was used in conjunction with the dual model, meaning that Finnish AMKs and universities serve different goals in the field of higher education and should not be combined on any level. The ongoing Bologna process, however, has led to some reform, where by complementing AMK studies with some theoretical studies, the route to higher degrees is open. Changes are described in detail in Education in Finland.

There are about 100,000 students in AMKs. The most common field of education is engineering, in which the schools offer high-level majors starting from a broad base of mathematics and physics related to the field of study. Engineers graduate after a minimum of four years and 240 ECTS credits are awarded. The degree of insinööri (amk) or ingenjör (YH) (for Swedish-speaking population) is often compared to the non-Finnish 'Bachelor of Engineering'.

Other typical fields of study in an ammattikorkeakoulu are health care (nursing), business, and culture.

More accurate naming
The term "university of applied sciences" was universally applied on January 1, 2006 to all Finnish ammattikorkeakoulus to give a more correct impression of the level of education given. The term is borrowed from the German "Fachhochschule". The decision could be made by the ammattikorkeakoulus, because there is no legislation concerning the translations of the terms.

Because degrees from an AMK are more oriented towards practical applications, compared to the degrees offered by Universities in Finland, a holder of an AMK degree, wishing to get a master's degree from a Finnish university, may have to complete 60 ETCS worth of theoretical and scientific studies in addition to the normal master's degree requirement.

Since 2005, the Finnish Parliament has approved the creation of a higher AMK degree, similar to the master's degree in universities. This has led to a small-scale boost in new degree programmes (in limited fields of education), to the extent of 60-90 ECTS credits. They will give similar qualifications as a university master's degree in the same areas of education. But a minimum amount of two years of work experience gained after the latest tertiary degree is needed to qualify for an AMK higher degree programme.

At the end of 2010, there were nationwide discussions about the excessive number of students in AMKs, especially in the fields of Engineering and Business. This is connected to a problem in funding — AMKs receive their funding largely based on the students enrollment numbers (this is changing to a more management-by-results approach).   This has led to an oversupply of AMK-educated people, compared to the needs of the labour market — the unemployment of AMK graduates is 8%, on par with the general unemployment rate. Some cuts to the number of student places were issued by the Ministry of Education, starting with a nationwide cut of 10% applied to the new student intake in 2007 and 2008.

See also
List of polytechnics in Finland
Tampere University of Applied Sciences
Vocational university

References

Education in Finland
Universities of Applied Sciences
Vocational education